Herring Run is a  tributary to Blackbird Creek in northern Delaware in the United States.

Course

Herring Run rises east of Townsend in southern New Castle County, Delaware and flows southeast to meet Blackbird Creek east of H&H Corner.

Watershed

The Herring Run watershed is about 26% forested and 64% agricultural with the rest being other land uses.  The watershed receives approximately 43.4 in/year of precipitation and has a wetness index of 602.69.

See also
List of Delaware rivers

Maps

References

External links
Delaware Watersheds: Blackbird Creek
Blackbird-Millington Corridor Conservation Area Plan

Rivers of Delaware
Rivers of New Castle County, Delaware
Tributaries of Delaware Bay